Robert McKnight (March 19, 1938 – March 21, 2021) was an ice hockey player who played for the Canadian national team. He won a silver medal at the 1960 Winter Olympics.

References

External links

1938 births
2021 deaths
Canadian ice hockey left wingers
Ice hockey people from Ontario
Ice hockey players at the 1960 Winter Olympics
Medalists at the 1960 Winter Olympics
Olympic ice hockey players of Canada
Olympic medalists in ice hockey
Olympic silver medalists for Canada
Toronto St. Michael's Majors players